Westenesch is a hamlet in the Netherlands and it is part of the Emmen municipality in Drenthe. There are two dolmen in Westenesch.

Overview 
Westenesch is a statistical entity, however the postal authorities have placed it under Emmen. It was first mentioned in 1362 as Westenesche, and means "western farmland". In 1932, it was home to 372 people. In 1991, the village was designated a protected site.

Dolmen 
There are two dolmen in Westenesch.  is small, however it is the only one on private property.  is a large dolmen with 21 side stones and 10 capstones. It originally had three gate stones. A bronze razor has been discovered at the site.

Gallery

References 

Populated places in Drenthe
Emmen, Netherlands